The 2000 UCI Mountain Bike & Trials World Championships were held in Sierra Nevada, Andalusia, Spain from 7 to 11 June 2000. The disciplines included were cross-country, downhill, dual slalom, and trials. The event was the 11th edition of the UCI Mountain Bike World Championships and the 15th edition of the UCI Trials World Championships.

Medal summary

Men's events

Women's events

Team events

Medal table

See also
2000 UCI Mountain Bike World Cup
UCI Mountain Bike Marathon World Championships

References

External links
 Results for the mountain-bike events on cyclingnews.com
 Results for the trials events on uci.ch

UCI Mountain Bike World Championships
International cycle races hosted by Spain
UCI Mountain Bike and Trials World Championships